Filippo Tasso (26 August 1940 – 17 December 2021) was an Italian professional footballer who played as a striker.

He played one season in the Serie A, in 1958–59, when he played three games and scored two games for A.S. Roma. He also played for Roma in the 1958–60 Inter-Cities Fairs Cup and scored two goals in their first round matchup against the German club Hannover 96.

Tasso died on 17 December 2021, at the age of 81.

References

External links
 Profile at Enciclopediadelcalcio.it

1940 births
2021 deaths
Italian footballers
Association football forwards
Serie A players
A.S. Roma players
A.S. Sambenedettese players
Taranto F.C. 1927 players
U.S. Lecce players
A.C. Monza players
Palermo F.C. players
Piacenza Calcio 1919 players
Footballers from Milan